Astarte is an ancient Semitic goddess.

Astarte may also refer to:

Arts
Astarte, an 1891 collection of erotic verse by Pierre Louÿs
Astarté, a 1901 opera by Xavier Leroux
Astarte, a 1931 novel by Swedish author Karin Boye
Astarte (ballet), a 1967 ballet by Robert Joffrey
Astarte (band), an all-female black metal band from Athens, Greece
Astarte, a painting by John Singer Sargent

Biology 
 Astarte (bivalve), a bivalve mollusc genus in the family Astartidae
 Astarte borealis, a bivalve mollusc species in this genus
 Astarte castanea, idem
 Astarte elliptica, idem
 Astarte subaequilatera, idem
 Astarte undata, idem
 Boloria astarte, a butterfly of the family Nymphalidae
 Callicore astarte, a butterfly of the family Nymphalidae
 Astartea, a genus of flowering plant in western Australia

Places
Mount Astarte, a mountain in the Pantheon Range of British Columbia, Canada
Astarte Horn, a mountain peak on Alexander Island, Antarctica
672 Astarte, a minor planet discovered in 1908

Use in fiction
Astarte, sometimes Sailor Astarte, an original character in Sailor Moon musicals
In Zadig, Astarté is the queen of Babylon and Zadig's final love interest
In Manfred, by Lord Byron, Astarte is the name of Manfred's lost love
Astartes, or Adeptus Astartes, a Warhammer 40,000 table-top wargame army more commonly known as the Space Marines
A Gallentean Command Ship class in the game Eve Online

Other uses
Prix d'Astarté, former title of the Prix Rothschild, a Group 1 flat horse race in France
Astarte Education, a Norwegian private school opened in 2007 by Princess Märtha Louise
HMS Astarte, a cancelled Amphion-class submarine